This is a list of Belgian television related events from 1973.

Events
25 February - Nicole & Hugo are selected to represent Belgium at the 1973 Eurovision Song Contest with their song "Baby, Baby". They are selected to be the eighteenth Belgian Eurovision entry during Eurosong.

Debuts

Television shows

Ending this year

Births
12 January - Tania Kloek, actress
22 February - Sandrine André, actress
19 March - Deborah Ostrega, TV host, actress & singer
13 August - Britt Van Der Borght, actress & singer

Deaths